The BNXT League Coach of the Year award is given annually at the end of the regular season of the BNXT League, which is the highest professional basketball league in Belgium and the Netherlands. This award is given to the coach who has achieved the most outstanding results with the talent at his disposal. This award will be given to both a Belgian and a Dutch coach.

The current award, given by the BNXT League, began when the BNTX League started (with the 2021–22 season).

BNXT League Player of the Year winners (2022–present)

Coach nationalities by national team:

References

External links
BNXT League - Official Site
BNXT League - Official Award Page
BNXT League at Eurobasket.com

European basketball awards
BNXT League basketball awards